La Berlière Castle is a castle in Houtaing in Ath, province of Hainaut, Wallonia, Belgium.
Hainaut is a province of Belgium in the Walloon region a historical county.

See also
List of castles in Belgium
La Berlière Castle, castles of Hainault

Castles in Belgium
Castles in Hainaut (province)
La Berliere Castle